Toms Creek may refer to:

Toms Creek, Virginia, an unincorporated community and coal town in Wise County
Toms Creek, Montgomery County, Virginia, an unincorporated community
Toms Creek (Missouri), a stream in Missouri
Toms Creek (Uwharrie River tributary), a stream in North Carolina
Toms Creek (Ararat River tributary), a stream in Surry County, North Carolina
Toms Creek (Monocacy River), a stream in Pennsylvania and Maryland
Toms Creek Falls, a waterfall in North Carolina

See also
Tom Creek